Nomatsiguenga (Matsigenka) is an Arawakan language of Peru. It is close enough to Machiguenga to sometimes be considered dialects of a single language, especially given that both are spoken by the Machiguenga people. Most speakers are monolingual.

Phonology
According to Lawrence, Nomatsiguenga has the following consonant and vowel phonemes.

Grammar
Nomatsiguenga is one of the few languages in the world that has two different causative mechanisms to denote whether the causer was involved in the activity with the causee or not. The prefix ogi- is used to express the idea that the causer was not involved in the activity, while the suffix -hag is used when the causer is involved.

References

Languages of Peru
Campa languages